John S. Dzienkowski is an American lawyer and academic. He currently serves as the John F. Sutton Jr. Chair at the University of Texas School of Law.

References

Year of birth missing (living people)
Living people
American lawyers
University of Texas at Austin faculty